Rhomboid-related protein 2 is a protein that in humans is encoded by the RHBDL2 gene.

Function 

The protein encoded by this gene is a member of the rhomboid protease family of integral membrane proteins. This family contains proteins that are related to Drosophila rhomboid-1. Members of this family are found in both prokaryotes and eukaryotes and are thought to function as intramembrane serine proteases. 

RHBDL2 functions as a sheddase and is localized to the plasma membrane. Known substrates of RHBDL2 include thrombomodulin and epidermal growth factor; profiling of the substrate repertoire of RHBDL2 has identified a number of additional type I membrane proteins substrates, including BCAM, SPINT1, and CLCP1.

References

Further reading